Irving Glickman (January 17, 1914 – October 2, 1972) was an American clinical researcher in the field of periodontology and author. He was one of the first to classify furcation defects and the role of occlusal trauma on periodontal disease and was described as "the father of periodontology."

Career
In 1941, Glickman joined the Tufts University faculty and became chair of the Department of Periodontology  in 1948.

In the 1950s, Glickman developed the bone factor concept about the factors that determine the severity of periodontal destruction, and developed a classification system for furcation involvement

In 1965, Glickman proposed a theory involving the relation of occlusal trauma to periodontal disease which led to further research in animal models.

Personal life and death
In 1954, Glickman married his student, Violeta Arboleda. Violeta had five sisters including Esmeralda, and Mireya. Glickman and Arboleda had a son, Alan, and a daughter, Denise.

Legacy 
In January 2012, Tufts University School of Dental Medicine dedicated the periodontology library to Glickman, naming it in his honor.

Selected works
 Clinical Periodontology  (originally published as Glickman's Clinical Periodontology, the Fifth Edition was dedicated to his memory. The book continued to be published under the editorship of Fermin A. Carranza, and the title changed to Carranza's Clinical Periodontology )

References

1914 births
1972 deaths
Periodontists
Tufts University School of Dental Medicine alumni
American dentists
20th-century American Jews
People from Williamsburg, Brooklyn
People from Boston
Brooklyn College alumni
20th-century dentists